The government and politics of Darien, Connecticut take place in a historically overwhelmingly Republican, upper-middle class coastal town with a Triple-A bond rating, and a tax base made up of wealthy homes, country clubs (some of the largest taxpayers), and some office buildings. Although modern Darien is largely a Manhattan suburb, its local government has more in common with traditional New England roots than New York.

As of August 1, 2006 the town Grand List (list of taxable property) amounted to $6.33 billion.

The Cablevision Channel 79 is the town Government-access television (GATV) cable TV channel for town residents to see meetings of local government boards and commissions.

Charter

In 1951, the town switched from an annual town meeting to a representative town meeting, which was considered more practical because of the growth of the town's population. In 1959, the state Legislature passed a special act allowing the town to consolidate all laws affecting the structure of its government into "A Special Act Consolidating Certain Special Acts Concerning the Town of Darien", now usually referred to as the town Charter.

Unique to Connecticut, Darien's town Charter "may be amended by action of the Representative Town Meeting (RTM) after a public hearing, a sixty-day delay, and an affirmative vote of a majority of the full membership of the RTM," according to the Darien League of Women Voters.

Appointed boards and commissions

Land use boards
Zoning Board of Appeals — five members appointed by the Board of Selectmen
Environmental Protection Commission — seven members appointed by the Board of Selectmen
Architectural Review Board — seven members appointed by the Board of Selectmen

Other appointed boards and volunteer posts

Commission on Aging
Beautification Commission
Building Board of Appeals
Cable TV Advisory Commission
Advisory Commission on Coastal Waters
Deer Management Committee
Board of Ethics (chosen from members of the Representative Town Meeting)
Five Mile River Commission (two members from Darien chosen by the governor of Connecticut)
Information Technology Committee
Monuments and Ceremonies Committee
Operations Planning Committee — made up of the four chairmen of major town boards (first selectman, chairman of the board of finance, chairman of the Board of Education, chairman of the Planning and Zoning Commission) the RTM moderator and the town administrator.

Parks and Recreation Commission
Parking Ticket Hearing Officers
Police Commission
Police Pension Board
Selectmen's Emergency Management Committee
Sewer Commission
Commissioners of Social Services
SWRPA (Southwestern Regional Planning Agency) representatives
Town Historian
Town Pension Board
Youth Commission — seven adults appointed by the Board of Selectmen, along with a full-time youth director and a Youth Advisory Committee made up of eight to 15 high school-aged teenagers.

Town departments and offices

Town employees hired by the Board of Selectmen
Nine paid officers of the town are hired by the Board of Selectmen, usually for a specific term. They are:

Administrative Officer — indefinite term
Building Official — four-year term
Finance Officer — indefinite term

Fire Marshall — indefinite term
Health Director — four-year term
Park and Recreation Administrator — four-year term

Public Works Director — indefinite term
Tax Assessor — three-year term
Town Counsel — two-year term

Public safety agencies and departments

In 2005, the town police department responded to 20,030 incidents, including 595 motor vehicle accidents, 1,766 motor vehicle infractions, and issued 254 traffic tickets and 1,150 traffic warnings. Police made 104 arrests for driving under the influence and received reports of 152 larcenies, 27 burglaries, three attempted burglaries, 82 incidents of vandalism, 19 assaults and six motor vehicle thefts. Police made 33 larceny arrests, 10 for burglary, 11 for vandalism, 15 for assault. No robberies, rapes, arsons or murders were reported in 2005.

The town received 1,675 false alarms in 2005, two actual alarms, 304 alarms that were canceled and 17 caused by weather.

The Town of Darien has three fire departments, all of which are staffed entirely by volunteers. These departments respond to all types of calls, including fire, electrical, CO alarms, motor vehicle accidents, downed power lines, cold water rescues, and any problem in the Long Island Sound.

Noroton Heights Fire Department

Founded 1903, the Noroton Heights Fire Department has about 150 members. "NHFD" is located on Noroton Avenue, and covers the northern part of Darien, including part of Interstate 95. Noroton Heights has a fleet of 5 active apparatus, including 2 Mack Engines, (21 and 23) 1 1988 Mack Quint, (20) which serves as their first due unit on most structural calls, a 1975 Mack Tanker, (22) and a 1989 Mack Rescue. Noroton Heights also has a Utility Truck, Truck 24, which is a 1991 Chevy Silverado, and a Chief's Car, Unit 200.

Noroton Fire Department

Founded in 1896, NFD has 140 members, of whom about 35 are active. NFD is located on Boston Post Road, and covers the smallest portion of Darien out of the 3 departments. Noroton covers the southern part of the Town of Darien, covering all the way down to the Stamford line. NFD currently has an active fleet of 5 apparatus: Engine 32, a 2002 Marion Pumper, which is first due on all structural calls and motor vehicle accidents. Engine 31, a 1972 open cab Maxim pumper, which is Noroton's second due engine. Ladder 30, a 1994 Sutphen Aerial, nicknamed "The Big Stick," for its 104' aerial. Rescue 33, a 1988 International Marion Medium Duty Rescue. NFD also operates the only firefighting and rescue capable marine unit in the town of Darien. Marine Unit 34 allows Noroton to respond year-round to the various types of emergencies that occur on Long Island Sound, and responds frequently to mutual aid calls from surrounding towns, and is in service year round. Noroton also has a Utility Truck, Truck 35, a 2001 Ford F-350.

In the late 1950s, the fire department was used for a "Lucky Strike" cigarettes advertising campaign. In a magazine ad, two firefighters are shown, cigarettes in their mouths, pausing as they wash fire engines in front of the building. A message in small type at the top of the advertisement asks smokers to "take care with cigarettes".

Darien Fire Department
Founded in 1895, covers the eastern side of town, encompassing about 45 percent of the land area.  The Noroton Heights and Darien Fire Departments cover a portion of Interstate 95 from exits 9 southbound to exit 13/14 northbound, one of the most disaster-prone stretches of highway in the country. Darien has a fleet of 5 active apparatus in their "barn." Darien operates twin Pierce Enforcer Pumpers, Engines 41 and 42, which replaced the previous Mack engines in 2006. Darien recently replaced its 1971 Mack Tower Ladder, the first aerialscope ever to be used in Connecticut, with a 2011 Seagrave 75' Tower Ladder built using the same boom as the original ladder.  Darien also operates a 2004 Saulsbury Custom Heavy Rescue, and a 1996 Mack Tanker. Darien additionally utilizes a 2002 Chevy Silverado as Utility Truck 46, and a Chief's car, Car 40, which was donated by a local resident in 2011. Also stored in Darien's firehouse is a 1928 Ahrens Fox Pumper, which is no longer in service, although still very active in parades.

Fire Marshal's Office
Established in 1980 as a full-time office, the agency works with the three volunteer fire departments in town and conducts annual inspections of all buildings (except one- and two-family houses), investigates fires, plans review and construction inspections of all buildings (except one- and two-family houses), conducts fire-prevention education programs, issues permits for blasting and tank removals, inspects and certifies hazardous material transport vehicles housed in town, inspects and certifies all day-care centers, nursery schools, convalescent centers and establishments with liquor permits, among other duties.

Other town departments
 Assessor's Office — sets values on all real and personal property in order to establish the town "Grand List" (a list of taxable property). The town has more than 7,100 real estate parcels and more than 18,000 taxable motor vehicles as well as more than 1,000 payers of "business personal property" taxes (taxes on business assets).
 Building Department — composed of the building official, an assistant building official, an office administrator, a secretary and a part-time building official.
 Finance Department
 Health Department — conducts inspections of food-service establishments. In the 2005–2006 fiscal year there were 106 establishments with licenses in addition to 48 temporary food services which received licenses. The department also inspects and issues permits for the installation and repair of all subsurface sewage disposal systems, reviews house plans to determine compliance with the state septic code, inspects local cosmetology shops and the town's nine public swimming pools, monitors water quality near beaches, issues shellfishing permits, conducts education programs, blood-pressure screenings, influenza clinics, and makes radon test kits available to residents.
Human Resources Department
 Information Technology Department
 Darien Library — the town government funds library operating expenses, including salaries, but the Library board of trustees oversees fundraising to buy books and other marterial.
 Planning and Zoning Department — the staff of six employees provides support to the Planning and Zoning Commission, the Zoning Board of Appeals, the Environmental Protection Commission and the Architectural Review Board. The department helps other departments with particular projects, such as providing maps for the Assessor's Office and salt-route mapping for the Public Works Department. An enforcement officer and code compliance officer investigate complaints of land-use regulations such as sign violations, illegal commercial activity within residential zones and violations of specific requirements set out in commission approvals.
 Public Works Department — with 30 full-time employees, it constructs and maintains town roads, buildings, bridges, storm and sanitary sewers, the Refuse Disposal Area (RDA, or "town dump"), two railroad stations, and municipal parking lots. The department has six major areas of responsibility:
 Public Works Management & Engineering — manages all Public Works Department functions, prepares contracts, hires consultants and contractors, prepares engineering documents, performs engineering reviews, carries out special projects
 Highway Maintenance & maintains  of public streets and 30 bridges in town, picks up Christmas trees, sweeps streets, picks up items residents leave by the street during the town's spring cleanup program, conducts the town's Household Hazardous Waste Day on the first Saturday in June, resurfaces about three miles (5 km) of roadway each summer, picks up leaves left near the roadside by residents starting in late October, maintains and upgrades street signs, maintains the tide gates at Gorham's Pond, removes and cares for trees on town property.
 Solid Waste Disposal and Recycling — this accounts for about 40 percent of the department budget. A private company working under contract operates the transfer station at the Refuse Disposal Area. The department operates other parts of the area, including the composting site, the residential recycling drop-off center and the bulk recycling transfer area. Refuse is trucked to the waste-to-energy incinerator in Bridgeport. Recycled material is hauled to the Intermediate Processing Center in Stratford for more sorting, packaging and sale.
 Public Building Management — cares for various town-owned buildings.
 Parking Facilities and Railroad & Maintenance — maintains and polices about 1,700 parking spaces in 13 lots in the downtown area and at the two railroad stations. A parking enforcement agent covers the downtown areas on foot and issues tickets.
 Sewer Collection System Maintenance
 Registrars of Voters
 Social Services — helps the poor, the elderly and others with special needs.
 Tax Collector's Office
 Youth Director and Youth Commission

Politics

As of December 1, 2005, the town had 12,099 registered voters, with 6,445 Republicans (53.1 percent), 1,940 Democrats (16 percent) and 3,703 unaffiliated voters (30.6 percent).

Darien is primarily a Republican town. The town has had Democrats in office as First Selectman. In 2003, Evonne Klein replaced Robert Harrel as first selectman, becoming the first Democrat to win the post in 14 years. Klein was re-elected in 2005.

The low percentage of registered Democrats does not mean that party has little representation in town government. The state's Minority Representation Law mandates that local elected boards have a maximum number of members from one party.

For a board with a total membership of three, no more than two may be from the same party. For boards with five members, no more than three; for boards of seven members, no more than five; for boards of nine members, no more than six.

Notes

External links
 Town government Web site
 League of Women Voters of Darien

Darien, Connecticut
Darien